Reshun is a village located on the left bank of Kunar River, in Upper Chitral District of Khyber Pakhtunkhwa, Pakistan.

Reshun is mentioned in Nizari Ismaili Pir Sabzali’s travel diary, in which he details his journey to Central Asia under the assignment of Aga Khan III Sir Sultan Mohammad Shah. Pir Sabzali describes the majlis that he experienced in the region of Reshun, held in devotion to the contemporary Ismaili Imam, as well as to the famous Persian luminary, Nasir-i Khusraw.

References

Populated places in Chitral District
Hill stations in Pakistan
Populated places along the Silk Road
Chitral District